Espinelves is a municipality in the comarca of Osona in Catalonia, Spain. It is situated in the Guilleries in the east of the comarca. Forestry is the main economic activity of the municipality, particularly the cultivation of the local species Abies masjoanensis 
for Christmas trees. The Romanesque church of Sant Vincenç d'Espinelves dates from the 11th and 12th centuries. The village is linked to Arbúcies and to 
Vic by the GI-543 road.

Demography

References

 Panareda Clopés, Josep Maria; Rios Calvet, Jaume; Rabella Vives, Josep Maria (1989). Guia de Catalunya, Barcelona: Caixa de Catalunya.  (Spanish).  (Catalan).

External links 

Official website ]
 Government data pages 

Municipalities in the Province of Girona
Municipalities in Osona
Populated places in the Province of Girona
Forestry in Spain